Fabian Rollins (born 4 January 1976) is a Barbadian sprinter. He competed in the men's 400 metres at the 2000 Summer Olympics.

References

External links
 

1976 births
Living people
Athletes (track and field) at the 2000 Summer Olympics
Barbadian male sprinters
Olympic athletes of Barbados
Place of birth missing (living people)